Virial coefficients   appear as coefficients in the virial expansion of the pressure of a many-particle system in powers of the density, providing systematic corrections to the ideal gas law. They are characteristic of the  interaction potential between the particles and in general depend on the temperature. The second virial coefficient  depends only on the pair interaction between the particles, the third depends on 2- and non-additive 3-body interactions, and so on.

Derivation

The first step in obtaining a closed expression for  virial coefficients is a cluster expansion of the grand canonical partition function

Here  is the pressure,  is the volume of the vessel containing the particles,  is Boltzmann's constant,  is the absolute temperature,  is the fugacity, with  the chemical potential. The quantity  is the canonical partition function of a subsystem of  particles:

Here  is the Hamiltonian (energy operator) of a subsystem of  particles. The Hamiltonian is a sum of the kinetic energies of the particles and the total -particle potential energy (interaction energy). The latter includes pair interactions and possibly 3-body and higher-body interactions. The grand partition function  can be expanded in a sum of contributions from one-body, two-body, etc. clusters. The virial expansion is obtained from this expansion by observing that  equals  . In this manner one derives

.
These are quantum-statistical expressions containing kinetic energies. Note that the one-particle partition function  contains only a kinetic energy term. In the classical limit  the kinetic energy operators commute with the potential operators and the kinetic energies in numerator and denominator cancel mutually. The trace (tr) becomes an integral over the configuration space. It follows that classical virial coefficients depend on the interactions between the particles only and are given as integrals over the particle coordinates.

The derivation of higher than  virial coefficients becomes quickly a complex combinatorial problem. Making the classical approximation and
neglecting non-additive interactions (if present), the combinatorics can be handled graphically as first shown by Joseph E. Mayer and Maria Goeppert-Mayer.

They introduced what is now known as the Mayer function:

and wrote the cluster expansion in terms of these functions. Here is the interaction potential between particle 1 and 2 (which are assumed to be identical particles).

Definition in terms of graphs
The virial coefficients  are related to the irreducible Mayer cluster integrals  through

The latter are concisely defined in terms of graphs.

The rule for turning these graphs into integrals is as follows:
 Associate a labelled coordinate k to each of the vertices, representing the continuous degrees of freedom associated with that particle. The coordinate 0 is reserved for the white vertex
 With each bond linking two vertices associate the Mayer f-function corresponding to the interparticle potential
 Integrate over all coordinates assigned to the black vertices
 Multiply the end result with the symmetry number of the graph, defined as the inverse of the number of permutations of the black labelled vertices that leave the graph topologically invariant.
The first two cluster integrals are

{|
| || || 
|-
| ||  || 
|}
The expression of the second virial coefficient is thus:

where particle 2 was assumed to define the origin.
This classical expression for the second virial coefficient was first derived by Leonard Ornstein in his 1908 Leiden University Ph.D. thesis.

See also
Boyle temperature - temperature at which the second virial coefficient  vanishes
Excess property
Compressibility factor

References

Further reading

http://scitation.aip.org/content/aip/journal/jcp/50/10/10.1063/1.1670902
http://scitation.aip.org/content/aip/journal/jcp/50/11/10.1063/1.1670994
 Reid, C. R., Prausnitz, J. M., Poling B. E., Properties of gases and liquids, IV edition, Mc Graw-Hill, 1987

Statistical mechanics